Jeumont may refer to:

Jeumont, a commune in the Maubeuge-Nord canton department in northern France
 Forges et Ateliers de Construction Electriques de Jeumont, precursor to Jeumont-Schneider
Jeumont-Schneider,  French electric and mechanical engineering group
Jeumont Electric, electric engineering company created from Jeumont-Schneider